Pla ra,  similar to padaek in Laos, is a traditional Thai seasoning produced by fermenting fish with rice bran or roasted rice flour and salt fermented in a closed container for at least six months. Fermented fish seasoning are commonly found in Cambodian, Lao, Mon, Thai and Vietnamese cuisine. Pla ra has a very strong smell, which is considered unpleasant by some people. Its flavors are salty and sour, depending on the amount of salt put in and lactic acid resulting from fermentation process.

History 
Pla ra was a common food in the Ayutthaya Kingdom. The French diplomat Simon de la Loubère, who visited Siam during the mid-Ayutthaya period, wrote about pla ra:

explained that the main source of food was rice and fish. Siamese people did not like to eat fresh fish. Fermented fish was popular as much as spicy Thai dip or Nam phrik. When he returned to France, he brought some pla ra with him.

Classification 
Pla ra is classified by its main ingredients. Pla ra that is fermented with roasted rice powder will become yellow with a soft texture and distinctive smell. Mostly used as a paste, this type of pla ra is usually produced in central Thailand. This type of pla ra usually has striped snakehead fish or catfish as a main ingredient. The other type is pla ra fermented with rice bran. The product's color is clear black with a stronger smell. The fish is softer and smaller. It is mostly found in northeastern Thailand as an ingredient, or as a raw food.

Pla ra which uses fresh fish is called pla ra sot. Its flavors are salty with a little bit sour from lactic acid. Pla ra lom uses dead fish with has an autolysis reaction until it has an unpleasant smell, or uses fish which is soaked in water for 12–24 hours until it is softer.

Process 
There are differing methods to produce pla ra. One method holds that there are two phases for making pla ra. The first phase is to ferment fish with salt until it is softer, and the next phase is to ferment it with rice bran or roasted rice powder for its scent and flavor. A second approach is to ferment the fish with salt and coarsely pounded, toasted, raw glutinous rice for at least six months. 

The process starts with cutting the fish into small pieces and fermenting it with salt. After 24 hours, the fish is arranged in a container (mostly a pot) until it is tightly packed and filled with salt water afterwards. The container is sealed for three months. After three months, a first stage pla ra will be mixed with rice bran or roasted rice powder. Then, it will be rearranged in the container and sealed for two months or more.

In 2018, the Thai Ministry of Agriculture published regulations to ensure the quality and hygiene of commercially-made pla ra.

Dishes 
Pla ra is usually eaten raw or as a chilli fish sauce (nam phrik pla ra). This dish is made of roasted green pepper, garlic, shallots, and boiled fish meat. All of these ingredients are ground together. Then boiled fermented fish liquid, fish sauce, and lime juice are added to the mixture. It is used as a side dish for dipping vegetables or eaten with rice. Pla ra can also be processed into a powder by baking it with some spices until it is dry and the grinding it all together. Nam phrik pla ra and Pla ra song krueng or lon pla ra are common in Thailand's Central Region.

Nutrition 
Composition of pla ra.

Many species of bacteria have been found in pla ra:
 Assorted species of Pediococcus, primarily P. halophilus
 Assorted species of Staphylococcus, primarily S. epidermidis
 Assorted species of Micrococcus
 Bacillus subtilis and B. licheniformis
 Other, non-spore-forming gram-positive bacteria
 Other gram-negative bacteria

P. halophilus is most prevalent when pla ra is fermented for three to five months. A study found that 90% of samples from markets contain this species of bacterium, so it has been concluded that it has an important role in the fermenting process, especially for pla ra'''s taste and aroma. Other Pediococcus species also have a role in the taste and aroma, but not as much as P. halophilus. Species of Staphylococcus, Micrococcus, and Bacillus act in protein degradation.

 Health issue 
When using pla ra as an ingredient for uncooked food, it is easily contaminated. An example is nam phrik (chilli fish sauce) which uses pla ra as an ingredient. Nam phrik is not cooked and is often kept for one or two meals. After a while, it will contain pathogens and have a high microorganism count. In some cases, nam phrik had both E. coli and S. aureus present, but no pathogenic organisms. The reason is the acid from tamarind made the pH less than 4.6, which prevents the growth of most pathogens. Pla ra before reheating is contaminated with S. aureus but the coliform is low and it is destroyed by cooking.

Other uses
In a recent move by the police and redevelopment workers to evict vendors from a market in the Khlong Toei District in Bangkok, the local vendors barricaded themselves in the market. During the scuffles that ensued, the traders made "stink bombs" with thin plastic bags filled with pla ra and hurled them at policemen. On 1 February 2010 bags of excrement and pla ra'' were thrown at Thai Prime Minister Abhisit Vejjajiva's house.

See also

References

Fish sauces
Thai cuisine
Fermented foods